Anbox was a free and open-source compatibility layer that aims to allow mobile applications and mobile games developed for Android to run on Linux distributions. Canonical introduced Anbox Cloud, for running Android applications in a cloud environment.

Anbox executes the Android runtime environment by using LXC (Linux Containers), recreating the directory structure of Android as a mountable loop image, while using native Linux kernel to execute applications. It makes use of Linux namespaces through LXC for isolation. Applications do not have any direct hardware access, all accesses are sent through the Anbox daemon.

Anbox was deprecated on February 3rd, 2023 as its no longer being actively maintained.

See also 

 Android-x86 - An open source project that makes an unofficial porting of Google's Android mobile operating system to run on devices powered by AMD and Intel x86 processors, rather than RISC-based ARM chips.
 BlueStacks has developed an App Player for Windows and MacOS capable of running Android applications in a container.
 The SPURV compatibility layer is a similar project developed by Collabora.
Waydroid is also Android in a container on a regular Linux system, using Wayland
Wine - A Windows compatibility layer for Unix-like systems.

References

External links 
 Anbox
 Port to Sailfish OS (not maintained anymore)
 Port to Purism / Librem 5
 Port to postmarketOS

Android emulation software
Compatibility layers
Free system software
Linux emulation software